Casalmaiocco is a comune (municipality) in the Province of Lodi in the Italian region Lombardy, located about  southeast of Milan and about  north of Lodi.

Casalmaiocco borders the following municipalities: Mulazzano, Dresano, Vizzolo Predabissi, Tavazzano con Villavesco and Sordio.

References

Cities and towns in Lombardy